Isaac Griffin (February 27, 1756October 12, 1827) was a veteran of the American Revolutionary War and member of the U.S. House of Representatives from Pennsylvania, serving two terms from 1813 to 1817.

Early life and career 
Isaac Griffin (great-grandfather of Eugene McLanahan Wilson and great-great-grandfather of Charles Hudson Griffin) was born in Kent County in the Delaware Colony.  He moved to Fayette County, Pennsylvania, and was engaged in agricultural pursuits.

Revolutionary War 
He was commissioned a captain during the American Revolutionary War.

Political career 
He appointed justice of the peace in 1794 and was elected a member of the Pennsylvania House of Representatives in 1807 and served four terms.

Congress 
Griffin was elected as a Democrat-Republican to the Thirteenth Congress to fill the vacancy caused by the death of John Smilie.  He was reelected to the Fourteenth Congress.  He was an unsuccessful candidate for reelection in 1816 to the Fifteenth Congress.

Death 
He died from the effects of a fall from a wagon, on his estate in Nicholson Township, Pennsylvania, on October 12, 1827.  Interment on what was known as the old Woods farm in Nicholson Township.

External links

The Political Graveyard

1756 births
1827 deaths
Members of the Pennsylvania House of Representatives
Accidental deaths from falls
Accidental deaths in Pennsylvania
Democratic-Republican Party members of the United States House of Representatives from Pennsylvania
People of colonial Pennsylvania
Burials in Pennsylvania